This article shows all participating team squads at the 2013 Women's European Volleyball Championship, held in Germany and Switzerland from 6 to 14 September 2013.

Pool A

Head coach: Giovanni Guidetti

Head coach: Gido Vermeulen

Head coach: Francisco Hervás

Head coach: Massimo Barbolini

Pool B

Head coach: Gert Vande Broek

Head coach: Fabrice Vial

Head coach: Marco Mencarelli

Head coach: Svetlana Ilić

Pool C

Head coach: Faig Garayev

Head coach: Viktar Hancharou

Head coach: Igor Lovrinov

Head coach: Jurij Maričev

Pool D

Head coach: Marcello Abbondanza

Head coach: Carlo Parisi

Head coach: Peter Makowski

Head coach: Zoran Terzić

References

E
Women's European Volleyball Championships
European Volleyball Championships